Craig McGill is a writer, journalist and media analyst. He has written three books which have been translated into several foreign languages: Football Inc: How Football Fans are Losing the Game, Do No Harm: Munchausen Syndrome by Proxy and Human Traffic: Sex, Slaves and Immigration. 

Previously deputy news editor for the Scottish edition of the Daily Mirror, he has written for Time magazine, The Guardian and The Sunday Times. His UK stories include revealing gangsters selling a hitlist called "Know the Provo" in Scottish pubs and David Tennant being the new Doctor Who.   AllMediaScotland, a Scottish website voted him a Media Personality of the Year.

He was educated at St Timothy's and St Andrews in Glasgow and Napier University, Edinburgh, where he was editor of the student newspaper Veritas, following in the footsteps of founding editor Neil McIntosh.

McGill now works in PR.

In 2010, he revealed Matt Smith as the eleventh doctor, following a leak at the BBC.

External links
 Official Site
 Profile page at fusionpress.co.uk
 Craig McGill Is Mentally Ill, article at ninthart.com
 Craig McGill Is Still Mentally Ill, follow-up article at ninthart.com

Scottish journalists
Scottish biographers
Living people
Year of birth missing (living people)